Real Life Adventures is a nationally syndicated daily comic strip created by Lance Aldrich and Gary Wise and launched on March 24, 1991. It is most often a single-panel strip, except for Sundays.  The strip deals with everyday foibles.

The comic's creators were former advertising executives from Southfield, Michigan who began creating the comic strip in 1991.

References

External links 
 Real Life Adventures at GoComics
 Real Life Adventures on washingtonpost.com
 Feature detail about RLA on UPS

1991 comics debuts
American comic strips
GoComics